The Roatán coral snake (Micrurus ruatanus) also known as Coral de la Isle de Roatán or Coral Roatanense in Spanish is a critically endangered species of elapid snake, endemic to the island of Roatán off of the coast of Honduras. There are no recognized subspecies.

References 

Micrurus
Endemic fauna of Honduras
Reptiles of Honduras
Roatán
Snakes of Central America
Critically endangered fauna of North America
Reptiles described in 1895
Taxa named by Albert Günther